William Stanard (April 6, 1867 – July 5, 1936) was an American Negro league outfielder in the 1880s.

A native of Washington, DC, Stanard played for the Pittsburgh Keystones in 1887. In seven recorded games, he posted 14 hits in 35 plate appearances. Stanard died in South Fayette Township, Pennsylvania in 1936 at age 69.

References

External links
Baseball statistics and player information from Baseball-Reference Black Baseball Stats and Seamheads

1867 births
1936 deaths
Pittsburgh Keystones players
Baseball outfielders
Baseball players from Washington, D.C.
20th-century African-American people